Ahunui or Nga-taumanga is a small atoll of the eastern Tuamotu Archipelago in French Polynesia. It is located 55 km SSE of Paraoa Atoll and 120 km WSW of Vairaatea.

Ahunui Atoll is roughly circular in shape and measures 6.5 km in diameter. It has a land area of approximately 5.4 km2 and a lagoon area of 34 km2. Its lagoon is totally encircled by the reef, so that it is not connected to the ocean by a pass. The islands have coconut plantations on them.

Ahunui Atoll is permanently uninhabited, but it is visited occasionally by neighboring islanders. The rarer pipi oysters (Pinctada maculata) are found in its lagoon.

History
The first recorded European who arrived to Ahunui Atoll was British mariner Frederick William Beechey. He named it "Byam Martin" after Admiral of the Fleet Sir Thomas Byam Martin.

Administration
Ahunui belongs to the commune of Hao (Main village: Otepa), which includes Ahunui (uninhabited), Nengonengo, Manuhangi (uninhabited) and Paraoa (uninhabited).

See also

 Desert island
 List of islands

References

External links
Atoll list (in French)
W. Beechey

Atolls of the Tuamotus
Uninhabited islands of French Polynesia